Peter Kofi Sedufia is a Ghanaian filmmaker and producer.

Biography 
Sedufia attended the National Film and Television Institute of Ghana, majoring in film directing. After directing numerous short films, he released his first feature film, Keteke.

Filmography

Feature films 
 2017: Keteke
 2018: Sidechic Gang
 2020: Aloe Vera

Short films 
 2014: The Traveller
 2016: Master and 3 Maids

References

External links 
 

Ghanaian film directors
Ghanaian film producers
Living people
Year of birth missing (living people)